Lukianivska Prison is a famous historical prison in the Ukrainian capital Kyiv, located in the central Lukianivka neighborhood of the city. It is officially known as SIZO#13 which is a portmanteau for Slidchyi IZOliator.

Though the facility is now functioning as a pre-conviction detention center, it is still colloquially called a "prison". The compound now includes minor examples of the historical architecture. The prison is infamous for its poor condition. Since late February 2016 the complex is on sale; its buyer has to build a new detention facility outside Kyiv in exchange for the territory of Lukyanivska Prison.

History

The foundation of the prison dates back to early 19th century when it was built by the guberniya architect Mikhail Ikonnikov in 1859-1862. It was officially commissioned in 1863. In Soviet times the prison's church was converted to include extra holding cells. The prison contains several subterranean corridors that connect the prison's buildings with each other. During the Stalinism it was the prison of the OGPU Ministry of Internal Affairs of the Soviet Union during which time it accounted for more than 25,000 inmates.

The prison consists of several buildings that over the years were uniquely titled by the holdovers. The oldest building is known as Katenka. It is the building that kept all of those sentenced to life imprisonment. The next oldest building is called Stolypinka which was named after the Russian Prime Minister Stolypin. Later another two buildings were added to its structure: Brezhnivka (built after the war) and Kuchmovka (built at times of the Ukrainian independence). There is also a juvenile detention building known as Maloletka ("Underage") or Stalinka. Other buildings are ZhK (female building), Bolnichka (Hospital).

Ukrainian Ombudsman Nina Karpachova stated in September 2011 that while the facility was designed for 2,850 inmates, 3,800 were held there at the time; she also pointed out that 47 inmates with active tuberculosis threatened the health of other inmates and personnel. It is reported that there is no hot water in the facility. According to TVi constitutional rights of prisoners has been violated in the institute. In April 2012 Kyiv Prosecutor Anatoliy Melnyk stated the facility was and had been regularly overcrowded.

In order to improve the living conditions of inmates the Ukrainian Ministry of Justice put the Lukyanivska complex on sale late February 2016.  Its buyer has to build a new detention facility outside Kyiv in exchange for the territory of Lukyanivska Prison.

Notable inmates
 Felix Dzerzhinsky, later head of the Cheka and OGPU
 Maxim Litvinov (Meir Wallach), a Soviet diplomat
 Archduke Wilhelm of Austria, a Ukrainian national activist, military leader
 Oleg Orlov, an arms smuggler and the prototype for the main protagonist in Lord of War
 Yulia Tymoshenko (née: Grigyan), political activist, former Prime Minister of Ukraine
In February 2001, the former Ukrainian Prime Minister Yulia Tymoshenko spent forty two days there as a suspect in a corruption case, but was later acquitted. The prison experienced mass protests and picketing by supporters of Tymoshenko.
During her trial over abuse of office Tymoshenko was arrested and again detained at Lukyanivska Prison between August 5, 2011 and 2014.
 Josyf Slipyj, a VI Cardinal of Ukrainian Greek Catholic Church
 Hryhorij Chomyszyn, a Ukrainian Catholic bishop and martyr
 Maksym Rylsky, a Ukrainian poet
 Sergei Parajanov, an Armenian film director
 Anatoly Lunacharsky, a Soviet People's Commissar (Sovnarkom)
 Nikolai Kibalchich, a rocket pioneer, Russian revolutionary
 Irina Kakhovskaya, an organizer of General von Eichhorn assassination
 Jarosław Dąbrowski, a Polish national activist, military leader
 Vyacheslav Chornovil, a Ukrainian national activist
 Moisei Uritsky, a chekist, Old Bolshevik
 Volodymyr Vynnychenko, a Prime Minister of Ukraine in Ukrainian People's Republic
 Nikolay Bauman, an Old Bolshevik
 Pavel Bermondt-Avalov, a Russian general
 Several activists of the 2001 UBK campaign were inmates of the facility when convicted for riot activities.
 Yuriy Lutsenko, a former Ukrainian Minister of Internal Affairs

References

External links
 Russian news agency reports on Tymoshenko's case

1860s establishments in Ukraine
1863 establishments in the Russian Empire
Prisons in Ukraine
Buildings and structures in Kyiv
Government buildings completed in 1863
Prisons in the Soviet Union